Ana Viegas (born 14 September 1990) is a Portuguese footballer who plays as a midfielder and has appeared for the Portugal women's national team.

Career
Viegas has been capped for the Portugal national team, appearing for the team during the 2019 FIFA Women's World Cup qualifying cycle.

References

External links
 
 
 

1990 births
Living people
Portuguese women's footballers
Portugal women's international footballers
Women's association football midfielders